The 4th FINA World Junior Synchronised Swimming Championships was held July 20–23, 1995 in Bonn, Germany. The synchronised swimmers are aged between 15 and 18 years old from 28 nations, swimming in three events: Solo, Duet and Team.

Participating nations
28 nations swam at the 1995 World Junior Championships were:

Results

References

FINA World Junior Synchronised Swimming Championships
1995 in synchronized swimming
Swimming
Jun
International aquatics competitions hosted by Germany
Synchronised swimming in Germany
20th century in Bonn